Rochester Bridge railway station served Rochester and Strood in Kent, England.

It was opened as Strood by the London, Chatham and Dover Railway in 1860. After several name changes and the merger of the LC&DR into the South Eastern and Chatham Railway, it closed as Rochester Bridge in 1917. It lay derelict until it was demolished in the late 1960s in preparation for widening of the A2 road, which opened in 1970, its bridge of the River Medway using the piers of the southern span of the railway bridge.

References

Disused railway stations in Kent
Former London, Chatham and Dover Railway stations
Railway stations in Great Britain opened in 1860
Railway stations in Great Britain closed in 1917